Emumägi is the hill in Väike-Maarja Parish, Lääne-Viru County, Estonia. The hill is the highest point in Northern Estonia. Its absolute height is 166.5 m and relative height is 80 m.

On top of the hill, there is watch tower with height of 21.5 m.

For protection of the hill and its vicinity, there is formed Emumäe Landscape Conservation Area.

References

Hills of Estonia
Väike-Maarja Parish